Khiladi Lal Bairwa  is an Indian politician and a Member of Parliament of India.  Bairwa is a member of the 15th Lok Sabha of India. He represents the Karauli–Dholpur constituency of Rajasthan and is a member of the Indian National Congress political party.

Early life and education
Mr.lal Bairwa was born in Salempur, Karauli district in the state of Rajasthan. Khiladi Lal Bairwa is a graduate and received B.A degree from the Hindi Vishwavidyalaya in Allahabad (Uttar Pradesh). Bairwa is a businessperson by profession.

Political career
Khiladi Lal Bairwa has been in active politics since early 2000s but this is first term as an elected parliamentarian. Bairwa is the first M.P to be elected from Karauli–Dholpur constituency since this constituency came into existence in 2008 as a part of the implementation of delimitation of parliamentary constituencies based on the recommendations of the Delimitation Commission of India.

He also is member of two committees.

Controversy
In Dec 2013, an Indian news website Cobrapost claimed that they conducted a sting operation. Cobrapost further claimed that eleven Indian M.Ps, in lieu of money were willing to write recommendation letters and lobby with the Ministry of Petroleum and Natural Gas to favour a (fictitious) foreign oil company. Sting operation was code-named Operation Falcon Claw. Khiladi Lal Bairwa was one of the accused politicians.

Posts Held

See also

15th Lok Sabha
Lok Sabha
Politics of India
Parliament of India
Government of India
Indian National Congress

References 

India MPs 2009–2014
1964 births
Rajasthani politicians
Indian National Congress politicians from Rajasthan
Lok Sabha members from Rajasthan
Living people
People from Karauli district